Calbuco Island (also Caicaén Island) is an island in the commune of Calbuco, Llanquihue Province, Los Lagos Region, Chile. The city of Calbuco is on the island. The island was separated from the mainland by Calbuco Channel, but a causeway was built in 1965 to connect the island to the continent.

In 1603 the Spanish under the command of Francisco Hernández Ortiz-Pizarrro established a fort on the island to protect their settlements in the Gulf of Ancud.

Notes and references

Calbuco Archipelago
Islands of Los Lagos Region